Goines is a surname. Notable people with the surname include:

David Lance Goines (born 1945), American artist
Donald Goines (1936–1974), American writer
Donny Goines, American rapper
Jeffrey Goines, fictional character in 12 Monkeys
Jennifer Goines, fictional character
Lincoln Goines (born 1953), American musician
Siena Goines (born 1969), American actress
Victor Goines (born 1961), American jazz musician